The Town of Center is a Statutory Town located in Saguache and Rio Grande counties in Colorado, United States. The town's population was 1,929 at the 2020 United States Census with 1,885 residing in Saguache County and 44 residing in Rio Grande County.

Description
Leach Airport is located 4 miles east and 3 miles north of town, at County Road 53 and County Road C. The nearest college is Adams State College; 23 miles to Alamosa, Colorado.

The town lies near the center of the San Luis Valley, hence the name.

Geography

Demographics

As of the census of 2012, there were 2,271 people, 768 households, and 603 families residing in the town. The racial makeup of the town was 10.3% White, 0.3% African American, 1% Native American, 0.09% from other races, and 0.09% from two or more races. Hispanic or Latino of any race were 87.4% of the population.

There were 768 households, out of which 47.8% had children under the age of 18 living with them, 56.3% were married couples living together, 17.4% had a female householder with no husband present, and 21.4% were non-families. 18.2% of all households were made up of individuals, and 7.8% had someone living alone who was 65 years of age or older.  The average household size was 3.11 and the average family size was 3.56.

In the town, the population was spread out, with 35.2% under the age of 18, 11.1% from 18 to 24, 27.4% from 25 to 44, 17.0% from 45 to 64, and 9.3% who were 65 years of age or older.  The median age was 28 years. For every 100 females, there were 99.2 males.  For every 100 females age 18 and over, there were 96.8 males.

The median income for a household in the town was $23,780, and the median income for a family was $26,143. Males had a median income of $20,844 versus $18,036 for females. The per capita income for the town was $9,289.  About 27.1% of families and 27.5% of the population were below the poverty line, including 31.6% of those under age 18 and 22.8% of those age 65 or over.

Education
 Public high schools:
 Center High School - grades 9 - 12
 The Academic Recovery Center of San Luis Valley - grades 9 - 12
 Public elementary/middle schools:
 Haskin Elementary School
 Skoglund Middle School - grades 6 - 8
 Private elementary/middle school in Center:
 High Valley Christian School

See also

 List of municipalities in Colorado

References

External links

 Town of Center contacts
 CDOT map of the Town of Center

Towns in Rio Grande County, Colorado
Towns in Saguache County, Colorado
Towns in Colorado